Astrid is a feminine given name of Scandinavian origin, a modern form of the name Ástríðr.

Variants 
 Assan (diminutive) (Swedish)
 Asta (diminutive) (Swedish, Norwegian, Danish. Estonian, Finnish, Lithuanian)
 Astrid (Swedish, Dutch, Danish, German, Norwegian, Estonian, French, Spanish)
 Astrida (Lithuanian)
 Astride (French, Portuguese)
 Ástríður (Icelandic)
 Astrithr (North Germanic)
 Astrud
 Ásta (Icelandic)
 Ástride, Astride (Portuguese)
 Sassa (diminutive) (Swedish)

People

Arts and culture
 Astrid Roelants, Belgian singer
 Astrid Allwyn (1905–1978), American actress
 Astrid Bergès-Frisbey Catalan-French actress
 Astrid Carolina Herrera (born 1963), Venezuelan actress and Miss World 1984
 Astrid Hadad (born 1957), Mexican vocalist and performance artist
 Astrud Gilberto (born 1940), Brazilian singer
 Astrid Holm (1893–1961), Danish stage and film actress 
Astrid Jorgensen, New Zealand-Australian vocalist, conductor and composer
 Astrid Kannel (born 1967), Estonian television journalist
 Astrid Kirchherr (1938–2020), German photographer and artist, known for her association with The Beatles
 Astrid Lindgren (1907–2002), Swedish author of children's literature, among others Pippi Longstocking
 Astrid Lepa (1924–2015), Estonian actress and director
 Astrid Noack (1888–1957), Danish sculptor
 Astrid North (1973–2019), German soul singer
 Astrid Reinla (1948–1995), Estonian writer
 Astrid S (born Astrid Smeplass, born 1996), a Norwegian singer and songwriter
 Astrid Sartiasari (born 1982), Indonesian singer 
 Astrid Varnay (1918–2006), Swedish-born operatic soprano
 Astrid Villaume (1923–1995), Danish actress
 Astrid Williamson, Scottish musician

Politics and royalty
 Astrid Gjertsen (born 1928), Norwegian politician
 Astrid Krag (born 1982),  Danish politician, member of parliament for the Socialist People's Party (SF)
 Astrid Løken (1911–2008), Norwegian entomologist and member of the Norwegian resistance movement during World War II
 Astrid Lulling (born 1929), Luxembourg politician and Member of the European Parliament
 Astrid Njalsdotter (died 1060), Swedish queen, consort of King Edmund the Old
 Astrid Olofsdotter (died 1035), Queen Consort of King Olav II of Norway
 Astrid Thors (born 1957), Finnish politician
 Princess Astrid of Belgium, Archduchess of Austria-Este (born 1962), daughter of Albert II, sister of current king Philippe I
 Princess Astrid of Norway (born 1932), sister to King Harald V of Norway
 Queen Astrid of the Belgians (1905–1935), Swedish princess and first wife of King Leopold III of the Belgians.

Science
 Astrid Beckmann (born 1957), German physicist
 Astrid Cleve (1875–1968), Swedish botanist, chemist, geologist, and researcher
Astrid Linder, Swedish researcher in motor vehicle safety

Sports
 Astrid Ayling (born 1951), German and British rower
 Astrid Crabo (born 1971), Swedish badminton player
 Astrid Guyart (born 1983), French fencer
 Astrid Kumbernuss (born 1970), champion German shot putter and discus thrower
 Astrid Lødemel (born 1971), Norwegian alpine skier
 Astrid Sandvik (born 1939), Norwegian skier
 Astrid Strauss (born 1968), former freestyle swimmer for East Germany
 Astrid Uhrenholdt Jacobsen (born 1987), Norwegian cross-country skier
 Astrid van Koert (born 1970), Dutch rower

Other 
 Astrid Blume (1872-1924), Danish educator and temperance advocate
 Astrid Medina (born 1977), Colombian coffee producer
 Estrid, 11th century Swedish woman whose saga is immortalized on six or seven runestones
Astrid Holleeder (born 1965), sister to Dutch criminal Willem Holleeder and author
Astrid Rosing Sawyer (1874-1954), Danish-born Chicago businesswoman, translator

Fictional characters 
 Astrid Hofferson, a major protagonist in the How to Train Your Dragon franchise
 Astrid, a Danish countess from Wallace Stegner's 1976 novel The Spectator Bird
Astrid, a friend of Juliette Darling's in the short-lived drama Dirty Sexy Money
 Astrid, an assassin from the video game The Elder Scrolls V: Skyrim
 Astrid, character in the television series Vikings
 Astrid Bromure, main character from the Belgian comics series of the same name, by Fabrice Parme
 Astrid Ellison, a female protagonist in the Gone series by Michael Grant
 Astrid Farnsworth, a character on the Tv Sci-fi series Fringe
 Astrid Ferrier, the main guest protagonist in the 1967–1968 Doctor Who serial The Enemy of the World
 Astrid Finch, a character on the TV Series The Tomorrow People
 Astrid Larsson, a character in The Emberverse series
 Astrid Leong, a character in the novel Crazy Rich Asians by Kevin Kwan
 Astrid Levinson, a character on NBC's The Office
 Astrid Magnussen, troubled teenage protagonist of the novel White Oleander
 Astrid Nielsen, lead character in French TV series Astrid et Raphaëlle (started March, 2019).  Astrid is autistic and has a near photographic memory.  She uses her vast knowledge of police records to help solve crimes.  Played by actress Sara Mortensen
 Astrid Peth, the Companion in the 2007 Doctor Who Christmas special Voyage of the Damned
 Astrid Thomas, A Tremere vampire from Vampire: The Eternal Struggle TCG
 Astrid Zexis, A character from the game series Atelier Rorona, Atelier Totori, and Atelier Meruru
 Astrid O'Hara, a character in the Australian sitcom Ja'mie: Private School Girl
 Astrid, one of the protagonists in The Long Dark video game.
 Astrid Beck, a female wizard NPC played by Matthew Mercer in the web series 'Critical Role'

See also
Astrit

References

Feminine given names
Danish feminine given names
Dutch feminine given names
Estonian feminine given names
English feminine given names
German feminine given names
Norwegian feminine given names
Swedish feminine given names
Scandinavian feminine given names